S.A. Cook may refer to:

 Stanley Arthur Cook (1873–1949), Cambridge professor of Hebrew, lecturer in comparative religion, Encyclopedia Biblica editor
 Stephen Arthur Cook (b. 1939), American-Canadian computer scientist and mathematician
 Lacey Dancer (b. 1948), American author of romance novels, uses S.A. Cook as one of her various pen names